Pusztaottlaka (Puszta-Ott·lak·a) is a village in Békés County, in the Southern Great Plain region of south-east Hungary.

Geography
It covers an area of 18.88 km² and has a population of 471 people (2002).

Population
According to the last census in 2015 Pusztaottlaka/Otlaca-Pusta had a population of 474 people. The majority of the population is Hungarian with a 17% Romanian minority (74 people who spoke Romanian as a mother language).

Religion
According to the last census in 2001 133 people belonged to the Roman Catholic Church, 40 were Lutherans and 140 people followed "another faith". In the case of Pusztaottlaka/Otlaca-Pusta the latters are mainly Orthodox Romanians.

Name
Pusztaottlaka means "dwelling place on the puszta" in Hungarian. The Romanian name is the transliteration of the Hungarian one.

References

Populated places in Békés County